George Anthony Rosso (January 15, 1930 – January 28, 1994) was an American football defensive back in the National Football League for the Washington Redskins.  He played college football at Ohio State University and was drafted in the 25th round of the 1954 NFL Draft.

1930 births
1994 deaths
American football defensive backs
Players of American football from Pennsylvania
Ohio State Buckeyes football players
Sportspeople from Pennsylvania
Washington Redskins players